The Montreal Building (Portuguese: Edifício Montreal) is an apartment building in São Paulo, Brazil. It was designed by the architect Oscar Niemeyer (1907–2012) and executed by Carlos Lemos (1925-). The building was designed in 1950, construction began in 1951, and opened in 1954. It was one of several buildings in São Paulo commissioned by the Banco Nacional Imobiliário (National Real Estate Bank) to meet the demand for dense, high-rise residential structures in the center of the city. The building was the first of Niemeyer's large-scale works in São Paulo; it predates the Copan, Triângulo e Califórnia buildings. Basic units in the building sold for ₢$280,000 at the time of its opening.

The Montreal Building sits on a narrow, irregular corner of Ipiranga and Cásper Líbero avenues opposite of Praça Alfredo Lessa. Units in the building are small and were meant to attract single occupants or small families. The entrance hall features three large panels of mosaics by Emiliano Di Cavalcanti. The pattern of horizontal fins on the north façade of the building closely resembles that of the Banco do Estado de Minas Gerais, designed in the same period by Niemeyer. The brise soleil facing avenues Ipiranga and Cásper Líbero were removed in a 2004 renovation. Edifício Montreal is a listed building by the Municipal Council for the Preservation of Historical, Cultural and Environmental City of São Paulo (SPHAN).

References

Modernist architecture in Brazil
Oscar Niemeyer buildings
Residential buildings completed in 1954
Skyscrapers in São Paulo
Residential skyscrapers in Brazil